Tongaon is a village in Bhadgaon tehsil of Jalgaon District in Maharashtra state, India.

Demographics

Tongaon is one of the largest villages in Jalgaon District. As per the 2011 Census of India, Tongaon has 2,509 households with a population of 12,470 people, of which 6,490 are males and 5,980 are females.

References 

Cities and towns in Jalgaon district